Johanna Keimeyer (born 1982) is a German artist. She studied art and design, both in Germany and internationally, and has worked designing lighting fixtures, as well as experimenting with different photography techniques.

Early life 
Keimeyer was born in Filderstadt and grew up in Ueberlingen on Lake Constance. After finishing high school, she completed an apprenticeship as a carpenter at the wood working school of technology in Stuttgart-Feuerbach and as an upholsterer with Vitra AG in Weil am Rhein and Birsfelden in Switzerland.

She completed her education at Berlin University of the Arts, where she studied Product and Fashion Design, and at Tama Art University in Tokyo, where she studied Product Design. Keimeyer also studied Digital Media at the Rhode Island School of Design and at the MIT Media Lab in Boston, Massachusetts.

Work
From 2006 to 2011 Keimeyer worked principally with lamps. She received international attention by designing light fixtures from recycled materials collected throughout Europe. During this period she attended a workshop with Brazilian furniture designers Humberto and Fernando Campana. Keimeyer was commissioned by Alexander von Vegesack to create the lamp Trashure 2. Vegesack included the lamp in his private collection and presented it in the exhibition Adventure with Objects, which took place in Pinacoteca Giovanni e Marella Agnelli in Turin, Italy. The Italian TV station RAI Uno reported on the exhibition and subsequently Keimeyer's upcycled lamps were featured in a show about Berlin's creatives.

Productions
In 2012, Keimeyer staged her master thesis at Berlin University of the Arts, entitled Everything is Illusion. Between 2008 and 2013, she created an underwater photographic series called Pool Around Me, realized with the support of Martin Nicholas Kunz. Photographer Ed Ruscha photographed private pools in a similar series to show the uniformity of the pools and of the people. Keimeyer, on the other hand, shows bodies in hotel pools and, in contrast to Ruscha, places people back in the foreground. In 2016, Keimeyer staged a dance performance with five dancers and a light show during the re-opening of the Berlin Oderberger Stadtbad, a historic public bath restored into a hotel. The elaborate performance received wide media coverage. Photos from Pool Around Me were used to furnish the hotel rooms at Oderberger Stadtbad. In 2017 she realized the installation "Breathing Heart" as part of the official program of Art Basel. For this she created an enormous passable heart. Since 2020, Keimeyer has worked as a lecturer at the Berlin University of Applied Sciences (Hochschule für Technik und Wirtschaft Berlin HTW) and as a lecturer at the Berlin University of the Arts (Universität der Künste Berlin UdK).

Awards 
 2009 International Design Award (IDA), first rank, category: Student, Product Design, Lighting
 2010 Faces of Design Award, (FoD), Best Online Portfolio

Exhibitions (selection) 
 2008: participation on "Adventure with Objects“ in Pinacoteca Agnelli (Museum), Turin, Italy
 2010: participation on "Kunstforum Brandenburg“, Potsdam, Germany
 2011: participation on "Songs of the Sea“, National Glass Centre, Sunderland, UK
 2011: participation on "Luminous Times – Sustainable Architecture“, France, in cooperation with Vitra Design Museum and the Centre Pompidou, Paris, France
 2011: Audiovisuelle Installation, Bikini Showroom, Berlin, Germany
 2011: participation on "DMY international design festival“, Berlin, Germany
 2011: participation on "Young Design in Berlin“, Gallery Alte Schule, Berlin, Germany
 2014: participation on "Festival of Lights NYC“, im Manhattan Bridge Anchorage, Dumbo, Brooklyn, USA
 2015: participation on Gallery Weekend Berlin, Fotoausstellung im Kino International, Berlin, Germany

Installations (selection) 
 2014 "Everything is illusion“ video-projection, Manhattan Bridge Anchorage, Brooklyn (USA)
 2015 "Space, Motion and Community“ performance with Jonah Bokaer (USA) and Stavros Gasparatos (Greece), Boisbuchet, France
 2016 "A New Dawn“ installation in the historic swimming hall, Hotel Oderberger, Berlin, Germany
 2017 "BREATHingHEART“ installation, part of the official program of Art Basel, Basel, Switzerland

Literature (selection) 
 Alles ist erleuchtet, Sie macht aus Abfall Kunst, Johanna Keimeyer entwirft „Sustainable Design“, Welt-Kompakt, Nr. 252, 27. 12. 2010, p. 24 f.
 Ein Haus der Ideen bauen, in: Art Magazin, Nr. 2, February 2007, pp. 126 – 129.
 Johanna Keimeyer, „treat garbage like gold“, in: Ares Kalandides (Ed.), Berlin Design, Braun Publishing, Berlin 2009, p. 196 f. und p. 229. 
 Johanna Keimeyer, Recycle Lights, in: Henrietta Thompson (Ed.), Reinventa, la tua casa, Mailand 2013, p. 119. 
 New Glass Review 30, The Corning Museum of Glass (Ed.), New York 2009, p. 26. 
 On existential collecting, in: Adventures with objects, La collezione Alexander von Vegesack, Mailand 2008, p. II/13. 
 Joerg Suermann (Hrsg.),Weissensee Kunsthochschule Berlin (Design), copy culture, International Design Festival Berlin, Berlin 2011, p. 182 f.

References

External links 
 

1982 births
Living people
Berlin University of the Arts alumni
German women artists
People from Filderstadt
Rhode Island School of Design alumni
Tama Art University alumni